Mount Baxter may refer to:

 Mount Baxter (California), a mountain in the Sierra Nevada range of California
 Mount Baxter (Antarctica), a mountain in Antarctica
 Baxter Peak, the highest point on Mount Katahdin, the centerpiece of Baxter State Park, Maine